Marquis Zhao of Jin, ancestral name Ji (姬), given name Bo (伯), was the twelfth ruler of the state of Jin. He was also the second ruler of Jin in the Spring and Autumn period.

In 745 BC, the first year of his reign, he gave the land called Quwo, modern Quwo County in Shanxi, to his uncle, Chengshi. This is considered as when Jin split into two, the two being Jin and Quwo. Chengshi was later known as Huan Shu of Quwo.

In 739 BC, the 7th year of his reign, a Jin official named Panfu (潘父) murdered Marquis Zhao of Jin and welcomed Huan Shu of Quwo to ascend the throne of Jin. He accepted Panfu's welcome and entered Jin. When he entered, the Jin people brought troops to stop him from entering. He lost and retreated back to Quwo. Then, the Jin people asked the son of Marquis Zhao of Jin, Ping, to ascend the throne and he became the next marquis: Marquis Xiao of Jin.

Monarchs of Jin (Chinese state)
8th-century BC Chinese monarchs
739 BC deaths
Year of birth unknown
Assassinated Chinese politicians
8th-century BC murdered monarchs